Uptown Meridian (formerly Bonita Lakes Mall) is an enclosed shopping mall located in Meridian, Mississippi, United States.

History
The mall opened on October 15, 1997, and was owned by CBL & Associates Properties. In 2016, Bonita Lakes Mall was sold to RockStep Capital. Over one hundred shopping venues are located within or outside the mall. Venues include department stores, specialty shops, restaurants, eateries, and a movie theater. Bonita Lakes Mall was renamed Uptown Meridian in 2020.

Anchor tenants
 Belk (formerly McRae's)
 Dillard's
 Fitness Depot
 Golden Ticket Cinemas
 Hype Indoor Adventures

Former tenants
 Goody's
 JCPenney (closed in 2017)
 Sears (closed in 2018)
 United Artists Theatres

Bonita Lakes Crossing
Bonita Lakes Crossing is a shopping center located outside of the mall. Some of the stores in the center include Ashley Furniture HomeStore, Cato Fashions, and Jo-Ann.

References

External links
 Uptown Meridian official website

Shopping malls established in 1997
Shopping malls in Mississippi
Buildings and structures in Meridian, Mississippi
Tourist attractions in Meridian, Mississippi